The 1989 Washington Huskies football team was an American football team that represented the University of Washington during the 1989 NCAA Division I-A football season.  In its fifteenth season under head coach Don James, the team compiled an  record, finished in a three-way tie for second place in the Pacific-10 Conference, and outscored its opponents 332 to 225.  Bern Brostek was selected as the team's most valuable player.  Dennis Brown, Cary Conklin, Martin Harrison, and Andre Riley were the team captains.
  

After missing bowl season the previous year, the Huskies traveled south to Anaheim Stadium and defeated Florida  in the Freedom Bowl. They led  at halftime and held All-American running back Emmitt Smith, a future hall of famer, to just 17 yards on seven carries in his final college game. The Huskies climbed up to #23 in the final AP poll.

Schedule

Roster

NFL Draft
Six Huskies were selected in the 1990 NFL Draft.

References

Washington
Washington Huskies football seasons
Freedom Bowl champion seasons
Washington Huskies football